Charles "Chuck" A. Hedges (July 21, 1932 – June 24, 2010) was an American jazz clarinetist.

Early life and education 
Hedges was born in Chicago. He began playing clarinet while attending a military school. He received formal training under Claude Bordy and learned to play jazz on his own. He attended Northwestern University.

Career 
Hedges joined George Brunis's ensemble in 1953, remaining with Brunis through the end of the decade. He was active on the Dixieland revival scene in the 1960s, playing regularly at clubs in Chicago and Milwaukee into the 1990s. He worked with Wild Bill Davison for most of the 1980s and also worked with Alan Vaché and Johnny Varro. He released several albums as a leader in the 1990s and 2000s.

Personal life 
Hedges died in Waukesha, Wisconsin, in 2010. Hedges had six children.

Discography
 Bob Hirsch, Tommy Saunders, Chuck Hedges, Sid Dawson, Chuck Anderson, Steve Thede: Bob Hirsch and His Jazz All-Stars at briarcombe: A Jazz Picnic (1976) 
 Chuck Hedges, Johnny Varro, Ray Leatherwood, Gene Estes: The Square Roots of Jazz (1984)
No Greater Love (Arbors, 1992), with Eddie Higgins, Bob Haggart, Gene Estes
 Live at Andy's (Delmark, 1993), with Duane Thamm, John Bany, Dave Baney, Charles Braugham 
 Chuck Hedges and Allan Vaché: Clarinet Climax (Jazzology Records, 1998), with Howard Elkins, Jack Wyatt, Jim Vaughn, John Sheridan
Just Jammin': Chuck Hedges and the Milwaukee Connection (Arbors, 2001), with Henry "Bucky" Buckwalter, Gary Meisner, Dave Sullivan, Mike Britz, Andy LoDuca
 Chuck Hedges and Duane Thamm: Tribute to Hamp (Delmark, 2002), with Frank Dawson, John Bany, Charlie Braugham

References

American jazz clarinetists
Musicians from Chicago
1932 births
2010 deaths
Jazz musicians from Illinois
Arbors Records artists
Jazzology Records artists